Adam Johnson is a British classical pianist and conductor. He is currently artistic director and principal conductor of the Northern Lights Symphony Orchestra, which is based at St Saviour's, Pimlico.

Education
Johnson first studied at the Royal Northern College of Music in Manchester, under the tutorage of Kent Nagano, Martyn Brabbins, and George Hurst. He also studied under Peter Feuchtwanger and later obtained a Master's under the direction of Sir Mark Elder.

Career
Johnson's concerto debut was playing the Mozart Piano Concerto No. 15 at the Pavlovsk Palace, Saint Petersburg, aged 15, and he later went on to conduct with the Elemental Opera company He has assisted Ari Benjamin Meyers and guest conducted with the LSO. In the UK he has performed with Jonathan Pryce at St Martin in the Fields; and in Turkey, the United States, Spain, Norway, and Brazil.

Honours
Johnson was elected a Freeman of the Worshipful Company of Musicians in 2011, and was made a Fellow of the Royal Society of Musicians.

References

British male conductors (music)
Alumni of the Royal Northern College of Music
Living people
Year of birth missing (living people)
21st-century British musicians
British classical pianists
21st-century British male musicians